Harry Riebauer (4 July 1921 – 8 November 1999) was a German film and television actor.

Riebauer was born in Reichenberg (Liberec, Czechoslovakia) in a Sudetengerman family.

Active in acting from 1950 through 1990, one of his many roles was appearing as Sgt. Strachwitz in the film The Great Escape (1963). He was noted for his tall stature, standing 1.94 metres (6 ft 4 in).

He died in Berlin, Germany, at age 78.

Filmography

References

External links 
 

1921 births
1999 deaths
20th-century German male actors
German male film actors
German male television actors
German people of German Bohemian descent
Naturalized citizens of Germany
Actors from Liberec